Coleophora skanesella is a moth of the family Coleophoridae. It is found in Tunisia.

References

skanesella
Endemic fauna of Tunisia
Moths described in 1982
Moths of Africa